All Because of the Dog is a 1935 German comedy film directed by Fred Sauer and starring Weiß Ferdl, Julia Serda and Edith Oß.

Location shooting took place around Munich and Tegernsee. The film's sets were designed by the art directors Otto Guelstorff and Hans Minzloff.

Cast
 Weiß Ferdl as Sebastian Neumeyer, Postassistent
 Julia Serda as Cilly Neumeyer, seine Frau
 Edith Oß as Anny, seine Tochter
 Waldemar Spann-Müller as Schorschi, sein Sohn
 Heinz Dugall as Pepi, sein Sohn
 Peter Bosse as Der kleine Hansl, sein Jüngster
 Otto Sauter-Sarto as Hölzinger, Postmeister
 Trude Hesterberg as Lottchen, seine Frau
 Dieter Borsche as Franz, beider Sohn
 Willi Schaeffers as Pilzer, Notar
 Robert Jungk as Jean, Diener
 Irene Andor as Schmederer, Bäckermeisterin
 Wolfgang von Schwindt as Apotheker
 Otto Kronburger as Zimmermann, Neumeyers Kollege
 Lucie Euler as Frau Schwiebus
 Egon Brosig as Geier, Auktionator
 Vera Hartegg as Zenzi
 Else Lüders as Baumeisterin
 Karl Harbacher as 1. Gast im Restaurant
 Heinz Herkommer as 2. Gast im Restaurant
 Irene Hübner as Gast bei Frau Hölzinger
 Leo Peukert as Tierarzt
 Norma Wellhoff as Frau mit Hund

References

Bibliography

External links 
 

1935 films
Films of Nazi Germany
German comedy films
1935 comedy films
1930s German-language films
Films directed by Fred Sauer
German black-and-white films
1930s German films